Below is a partial list of minor league baseball players in the Colorado Rockies system and rosters of their minor league affiliates:

Adael Amador

Adael Alexander Amador (born April 11, 2003) is a Dominican professional baseball shortstop in the Colorado Rockies organization.

Amador signed with the Colorado Rockies as an international free agent in July 2019.

Amador made his professional debut in 2020 with the Arizona Complex League Rockies, hitting .299/.394/.445 with four home runs and 24 runs batted in (RBI) over 47 games. Amador started 2022 with the Fresno Grizzlies.

Warming Bernabel

Warming Jose Bernabel (born June 6, 2002) is a Dominican professional baseball third baseman in the Colorado Rockies organization.

Bernabel signed with the Colorado Rockies as an international free agent in July 2018. He made his professional debut in 2019 with the Dominican Summer League Rockies.

Bernabel did not play for a team in 2020 after the Minor League Baseball season was cancelled because of the Covid-19 pandemic. He returned in 2021 to play for the Arizona Complex League Rockies and Fresno Grizzlies and played 2022 with Fresno and Spokane Indians. After the 2022 season, he was selected to play in the Arizona Fall League.

On November 15, 2022, the Rockies added Bernabel to their 40-man roster to protect him from the Rule 5 draft. He was optioned to the Double-A Hartford Yard Goats to begin the 2023 season.

Blair Calvo

Blair Matthew Calvo (born February 27, 1996) is an American professional baseball pitcher in the Colorado Rockies organization.

Calvo played college baseball at Eastern Florida State College, Flagler College, and the University of Pittsburgh. He was drafted by the Texas Rangers in the 31st round of the 2016 Major League Baseball Draft, but did not sign. He was then drafted by the Colorado Rockies in the 23rd round of the 2019 MLB draft and signed. He made his professional debut that year with the Grand Junction Rockies.

The Rockies added Calvo to their 40-man roster after the 2022 season. Calvo was optioned to the Triple-A Albuquerque Isotopes to begin the 2023 season.

Julio Carreras

Julio Alberto Carreras (born January 12, 2000) is a Dominican professional baseball infielder in the Colorado Rockies organization.

Carreras signed with the Colorado Rockies as an international free agent in February 2018. He made his professional debut that season with the Dominican Summer League Rockies.

On November 15, 2022, the Rockies added Carreras to their 40-man roster to protect him from the Rule 5 draft. He was optioned to the Double-A Hartford Yard Goats to begin the 2023 season.

Jeff Criswell

Jeffrey Kelley Criswell (born March 10, 1999) is an American professional baseball pitcher in the Colorado Rockies organization.

Criswell attended Portage Central High School in Portage, Michigan. He was selected by the Detroit Tigers in the 35th round of the 2017 Major League Baseball draft, but did not sign and instead enrolled at the University of Michigan where he played college baseball.

In 2018, Criswell's freshman year at Michigan, he went 3–2 with a 2.23 ERA over 24 relief appearances. In 2018, he played collegiate summer baseball with the Brewster Whitecaps of the Cape Cod Baseball League. As a sophomore in 2019, he moved into the starting rotation and compiled a 7–1 record and a 2.74 ERA over 18 games (17 starts). In 2020, his junior season, he went 0–1 with a 4.50 ERA and 26 strikeouts over 24 innings before the season was ended short due to the COVID-19 pandemic.

Following the season, Criswell was selected by the Oakland Athletics in the second round (58th overall) of the 2020 Major League Baseball draft. He signed for $1 million. He did not play a minor league game in 2020 due to the cancellation of the minor league season caused by the pandemic.

To begin the 2021 season, he was assigned to the Lansing Lugnuts of the High-A Central. After his first start, he was placed on the injured list with a shoulder injury. He missed nearly four months before being activated in late August; he pitched a total of 12 innings during the season in which he gave up six earned runs and four walks while striking out 12. He was selected to play in the Arizona Fall League for the Mesa Solar Sox after the season. He returned to Lansing to begin the 2022 season. In mid-June, he was promoted to the Midland RockHounds of the Double-A Texas League, and he was promoted once again, to the Las Vegas Aviators of the Triple-A Pacific Coast League, near the season's end. Over 24 games (21 starts) between the three teams, he went 4-10 with a 4.03 ERA and 119 strikeouts over  innings.

On December 6, 2022, the Athletics traded Criswell to the Colorado Rockies in exchange for Chad Smith.

Niko Decolati

Nicholas Quinn Decolati (born August 12, 1997) is an American professional baseball right fielder in the Colorado Rockies organization.

Decolati was born in Boulder, Colorado, before moving to Las Vegas due to his father's job; he attended Cimarron-Memorial High School in Las Vegas. As a junior in 2014, he batted .414 with eight home runs. In 2015, his senior year, he hit .411 with ten home runs, 25 RBIs, and 39 runs, and was named the Southern Nevada Player of the Year.

After graduating high school in 2015, Decolati enrolled at Loyola Marymount University where he played college baseball. As a freshman in 2016, he played in 47 games (making forty starts) in which he hit .306 with four home runs and 33 RBIs, earning a spot on the All-West Coast Conference Freshman Team. In 2017, he played in 56 games, slashing .320/.426/.432 with four home runs and 24 RBIs. That summer, he played collegiate summer baseball for the Orleans Firebirds of the Cape Cod Baseball League, where he was named a league all-star. As a junior in 2018, he started 54 of 55 games and batted .271 with six home runs and 21 RBIs. After his junior year, he was selected by the Colorado Rockies in the sixth round of the 2018 Major League Baseball draft.

Decolati signed with the Rockies and was assigned to the Grand Junction Rockies of the Rookie-level Pioneer League. After being a third baseman all through high school and college, the Rockies immediately moved him to right field. He was named an All-Star. Over 69 games in Grand Junction, he batted .327 with 11 home runs and 56 RBIs. In 2019, he missed time at the beginning of the year after suffering a broken wrist, but returned to play in June with the Asheville Tourists of the Class A South Atlantic League, hitting .265 with six home runs and 38 RBIs over 77 games. He did not play a minor league game in 2020 since the season was cancelled due to the COVID-19 pandemic. Decolati was assigned to the Spokane Indians of the High-A West for the 2021 season, slashing .264/.341/.402 with 11 home runs, 56 RBIs, and 26 stolen bases over 100 games. He spent the 2022 season with the Hartford Yard Goats of the Double-A Eastern League but missed time due to injury. Over 44 games, he batted .199 with one home run and 17 RBIs.

Loyola Marymount bio

Brenton Doyle

Brenton Edward Doyle (born May 14, 1998) is an American professional baseball outfielder in the Colorado Rockies organization.

Doyle was born and grew up in Warrenton, Virginia and attended Kettle Run High School.

Doyle played college baseball for the Shepherd Rams for three seasons. He was named the Mountain East Conference Player of the Year after hitting .415 with 98 hits, 14 home runs, 16 doubles and 68 RBIs. Doyle repeated as a Conference Player of the Year after batting .392 with 13 home runs, six triples, 17 doubles and 47 RBIs and 79 runs scored as a junior.

Doyle was selected in the fourth round of the 2019 MLB draft by the Colorado Rockies. Doyle was assigned to the Grand Junction Rockies of the Pioneer League, where he led the league with a .383 batting average with 8 home runs, 33 RBI, and 17 stolen bases. He did not play a minor league game in 2020 since the season was cancelled due to the COVID-19 pandemic and spent most of the year training in Manassas, Virginia at a baseball complex alongside local college players until taking part in the Rockies' fall instructional league. Doyle was named the best overall athlete in the Rockies' minor league system going into the 2021 season. He was assigned to the Spokane Indians of the High-A West League for 2021, where he batted .279 with 16 home runs, 47 RBIs, and 21 stolen bases in 97 games played and awarded a Minor League Rawlings Gold Glove Award.

Doyle was optioned to the Triple-A Albuquerque Isotopes to begin the 2023 season.

Shepherd Rams bio

James Farris

James Robert Farris (born April 4, 1992) is an American professional baseball pitcher for the Colorado Rockies organization.

Farris attended Highland High School in Gilbert, Arizona, and the University of Arizona, where he played college baseball for the Arizona Wildcats. He pitched for the Wildcats in the 2012 College World Series. In 2012, he played collegiate summer baseball with the Orleans Firebirds of the Cape Cod Baseball League. The Chicago Cubs selected Farris in the ninth round of the 2014 MLB draft. After signing, he made his professional debut with the Boise Hawks, posting a 2.57 ERA in 14 innings pitched. He spent 2015 with the South Bend Cubs and Myrtle Beach Pelicans, compiling a combined 2–8 record and 3.47 ERA in 38 relief appearances, and 2016 with Myrtle Beach and the Tennessee Smokies, pitching to a combined 2–5 record and 2.59 ERA in 43 total games. After the season, he pitched for the Mesa Solar Sox of the Arizona Fall League.

On February 1, 2017, the Cubs traded Farris to the Colorado Rockies for Eddie Butler. He spent the season with both the Hartford Yard Goats and the Albuquerque Isotopes, collecting a 1–3 record and 3.59 ERA with 69 strikeouts in  innings. He did not play a minor league game in 2020 since the season was cancelled due to the COVID-19 pandemic.

Hunter Goodman

Hunter Goodman (born October 8, 1999) is an American professional baseball catcher in the Colorado Rockies organization.

Goodman played college baseball at Memphis for three seasons. He batted .326/.367/.573 with 16 doubles, 13 home runs, and 67 RBIs as a freshman and was named the American Athletic Conference (AAC) Newcomer of the Year. After the 2019 season, Goodman played collegiate summer baseball for the Hyannis Harbor Hawks of the Cape Cod Baseball League, batted .276/.291/.494, and was named a league all-star. He was batting .357/.416/.743 as a sophomore before the season was cut short due to the coronavirus pandemic. Goodman batted .307/.401/.678 with a school record 21 home runs in his junior season.

Goodman was selected in the fourth round by the Colorado Rockies in the 2021 Major League Baseball draft. In 2021 with the Arizona Complex League Rockies he batted .300/.419/.517.

He began the 2022 season with the Fresno Grizzlies of the Single-A California League.

Memphis Tigers bio

Jameson Hannah

Jameson Chandler Hannah (born August 10, 1997) is an American professional baseball outfielder in the Colorado Rockies organization

Hannah attended Flower Mound High School, in Flower Mound, Texas. He attended Dallas Baptist University and played college baseball for the Patriots. In 2017, he played collegiate summer baseball with the Bourne Braves of the Cape Cod Baseball League. As a junior in 2018, he batted .363 with six home runs and 48 RBIs over 59 games.

Hannah was drafted by the Oakland Athletics in the second round of the 2018 Major League Baseball draft. Hannah played for the Vermont Lake Monsters in 2018, hitting .279/.347/.384/.731 with one home run and ten RBIs over 23 games. He opened the 2019 season with the Stockton Ports and slashed .283/.334/.381/.715 with two home runs and 31 RBIs in 92 games.

On July 31, 2019, Hannah was traded by the Athletics to the Cincinnati Reds in exchange for Tanner Roark. He was assigned to the Daytona Tortugas, but played in only 18 games due to injury. He did not play a minor league game in 2020 since the season was cancelled due to the COVID-19 pandemic.

On November 25, 2020, Hannah was traded by the Reds along with Robert Stephenson to the Colorado Rockies in exchange for Jeff Hoffman and Case Williams. He spent the 2021 season with the Hartford Yard Goats, slashing .255/.324/.351 with three home runs, 17 RBIs, and 11 stolen bases.

Karl Kauffmann

Karl John Kauffmann (born August 15, 1997) is an American professional baseball pitcher in the Colorado Rockies organization.

Kauffmann attended Brother Rice High School in Bloomfield Hills, Michigan and played college baseball at the University of Michigan. In 2017 and 2018, he played collegiate summer baseball with the Yarmouth–Dennis Red Sox of the Cape Cod Baseball League. He was drafted by the Colorado Rockies in the second round of the 2019 Major League Baseball draft.

Kauffmann made his professional debut in 2021 with the Spokane Indians before being promoted to the Hartford Yard Goats. He started 2022 with Hartford.

Tony Locey

Anthony Quinn Locey (born July 29, 1998) is an American professional baseball pitcher for the Colorado Rockies organization.

Locey graduated from Houston County High School in Warner Robins, Georgia, and attended the University of Georgia to play college baseball for the Georgia Bulldogs. In 2017, he played collegiate summer baseball with the Brewster Whitecaps of the Cape Cod Baseball League. As a junior at Georgia in 2019, he started 15 games and went 11-2 with a 2.53 ERA and 97 strikeouts over 89 innings.

Locey was selected by the St. Louis Cardinals in the third round of the 2019 Major League Baseball draft. He made his professional debut with the Rookie-level Gulf Coast League Cardinals before being promoted to the Peoria Chiefs of the Class A Midwest League. Over 17 innings between the two clubs, he went 1–2 with a 5.29 ERA and 31 strikeouts. He did not play a minor league game in 2020 since the season was cancelled due to the COVID-19 pandemic.

On February 1, 2021, the Cardinals traded Locey, Austin Gomber, Mateo Gil, Elehuris Montero, and Jake Sommers to the Colorado Rockies for Nolan Arenado. For the 2021 season, he was assigned to the Fresno Grizzlies of the Low-A West with whom he appeared in 25 games (making ten starts) and went 3-0 with a 3.34 ERA and eighty strikeouts over  innings. He was assigned to the Spokane Indians of the High-A Northwest League to begin the 2022 season.

Willie MacIver

William MacIver (born October 28, 1996) is an American professional baseball catcher in the Colorado Rockies organization.

MacIver played college baseball at Washington for three seasons. In 2017, he played collegiate summer baseball with the Wareham Gatemen of the Cape Cod Baseball League, and was named a league all-star.

MacIver was selected in the ninth round by the Houston Astros in the 2018 Major League Baseball draft. After signing with the team he was assigned to the Boise Hawks of the Class A Short Season Northwest League. MacIver played for the Class A Asheville Tourists in 2019, where he was voted the best catcher in the South Atlantic League after batting .252 with 13 home runs and 60 RBIs in 117 games played. He did not play a minor league game in 2020 since the season was cancelled due to the COVID-19 pandemic but was later assigned to the Rockies' Alternate Training Site. MacIver was assigned to the Spokane Indians of the High-A West League to begin the 2021 season. He was promoted to the Double-A Hartford Yard Goats after batting .286 with 10 home runs in 46 games in Spokane. In June 2021, MacIver was selected to play in the All-Star Futures Game.

Washington Huskies bio

Helcris Olivarez

Helcris Olivarez (born August 8, 2000) is a Dominican professional baseball pitcher in the Colorado Rockies organization.

Olivarez signed with the Colorado Rockies as an international free agent in 2016. The Rockies added him to their 40-man roster after the 2020 season.

Olivarez spent the 2021 season with the High-A Spokane Indians, but struggled to a 4-9 record and 6.05 ERA with 112 strikeouts in 99.2 innings pitched across 22 appearances (21 starts). On May 28, 2022, Olivarez was placed on the 60-day injured list with a scapula strain in the back of his left shoulder. He was outrighted off the roster on November 9, 2022.

Joe Rock

Joseph Richard Rock (born July 29, 2000) is an American professional baseball pitcher in the Colorado Rockies organization.

Rock grew up in Aliquippa, Pennsylvania and attended Hopewell High School.

Rock played college baseball for the Ohio Bobcats. He pitched in 16 games with 11 starts as a freshman and went 2-4 with a 5.19 ERA and 41 strikeouts in 59 innings pitched. In 2019, he played collegiate summer baseball with the Wareham Gatemen of the Cape Cod Baseball League. In 2020, Rock was declared academically ineligible as a sophomore and redshirted the season. He started 14 games as a redshirt sophomore and pitched to an 8-3 record with a 2.33 ERA and 117 strikeouts.

Rock was selected in the second round by the Colorado Rockies in the 2021 Major League Baseball draft. After signing with the team he was assigned to Arizona Complex League Rockies, where he had a 1.13 ERA and 11 strikeouts in eight innings pitched. Rock was assigned to the High-A Spokane Indians at the start of the 2022 season.

Ohio Bobcats bio

Aaron Schunk

Aaron Livingston Schunk (born July 24, 1997) is an American professional baseball third baseman for the Colorado Rockies organization.

Schunk graduated from Lovett School in Atlanta, Georgia. He attended the University of Georgia, where he played college baseball for the Georgia Bulldogs. In 2018, he played collegiate summer baseball with the Harwich Mariners of the Cape Cod Baseball League, and was named a league all-star. In 2019, Schunk won the John Olerud Award.

The Colorado Rockies selected Schunk in the second round of the 2019 MLB draft. He made his professional debut with the Boise Hawks of the Class A-Short Season Northwest League. Over 46 games, he slashed .306/.370/.503 with six home runs and 23 RBIs. He did not play a minor league game in 2020 since the season was cancelled due to the COVID-19 pandemic. In 2021, he played with the Spokane Indians of the High-A West, slashing .223/.286/.346 with eight home runs, 45 RBIs, and 13 stolen bases over 89 games.

Jake Sommers

Jacob James Sommers (born May 5, 1997) is an American professional baseball pitcher in the Colorado Rockies organization.

Sommers attended Hortonville High School in Hortonville, Wisconsin. In 2015, his senior year, he pitched to a 1–0 record and a 1.77 ERA. Following his senior year, he enrolled at the University of Wisconsin-Milwaukee where he played college baseball. As a senior in 2019, he compiled a 3.60 ERA over thirty innings. After the season, he was selected by the St. Louis Cardinals in the tenth round of the 2019 Major League Baseball draft. Sommers signed with the Cardinals and made his professional debut with the Johnson City Cardinals of the Rookie-level Appalachian League, going 2–3 with a 4.18 ERA over 12 games (ten starts). He did not play a minor league game in 2020 since the season was cancelled due to the COVID-19 pandemic.

On February 1, 2021, Sommers (alongside Austin Gomber, Mateo Gil, Elehuris Montero, and Tony Locey) was traded to the Colorado Rockies in exchange for Nolan Arenado and $50 million. He was assigned to the Spokane Indians of the High-A West for the 2021 season, going 3-2 with a 5.59 ERA and 51 strikeouts over 37 innings. Sommers missed all of the 2022 season while rehabbing an elbow injury.

Sam Weatherly

Samuel Thomas Weatherly (born May 28, 1999) is an American professional baseball pitcher in the Colorado Rockies organization.

Weatherly grew up in Ann Arbor, Michigan and attended Howell High School. He was named Michigan's Mr. Baseball as a senior after going 6-2 on the mound with a 0.78 earned run average (ERA) and also batting .482. Weatherly was selected in the 27th round of the 2017 Major League Baseball draft by the Toronto Blue Jays, but opted not to sign with the team.

Weatherly played for the Clemson Tigers for three seasons. As a freshman, he made eight appearances with five starts and had an ERA of 6.64. After the season, Weatherly played collegiate summer baseball for the Kalamazoo Growlers of the Northwoods League. Weatherly went 2-0 with a 3.38 ERA in 21 relief appearances in his sophomore season. During the summer of 2019, he played for the Falmouth Commodores of the Cape Cod Baseball League and went 0-1 with a 4.32 ERA and 18 strikeouts over  innings pitched. As a junior, Weatherly had a 0.79 ERA struck out 43 batters in  innings pitched over four starts before the season was cut short due to the coronavirus pandemic.

Weatherly was selected in the third round by the Colorado Rockies in the 2020 Major League Baseball draft. He signed with the team on June 24, 2020, for the slot-valued bonus of $755,300. Weatherly was assigned to the Fresno Grizzlies of the Low-A West for the 2021 season.

Clemson Tigers bio

Full Triple-A to Rookie League rosters

Triple-A

Double-A

High-A

Single-A

Rookie

References

Minor league players
Lists of minor league baseball players